Fontanaluccia is a frazione of the comune of Frassinoro, Emilia-Romagna, central Italy. It is located at an altitude of 853 m.

Nearby is the dam on the river Dolo,  which provides water for the hydroelectric power plant of Farneta.

Cities and towns in Emilia-Romagna
Frazioni of the Province of Modena